Anindith Reddy is an Indian racing driver and healthcare entrepreneur. He was the National Champion Driver in the 2016 Euro JK 16 Championship and also in Euro JK 2017 Championship, and the motorsport person of the year 2017 at the Federation of Motorsports Clubs of India (FMSCI). He won Volkswagen Vento Cup 2015 in Delhi. He also won two races in MRF FF1600 class in the fourth round of MMSC-FMSCI Indian National Racing Championship. In 2019, he received outstanding achievement in world motor sport award from FMSCI.

Family 
Anindith Reddy is born to Sangita Reddy and Konda Vishweshwar Reddy. He is married to Shriya Bhupal, grand daughter of GVK Reddy. He is grandson of Prathap C. Reddy, and great grand son of Konda Venkata Ranga Reddy.

References 

Year of birth missing (living people)
Living people
Indian businesspeople
Indian racing drivers
JK Tyre National Level Racing Championship drivers